Elisabeta Lazăr (née Erzsébet Lázár, born 22 August 1950) is a retired Romanian rower who mostly competed in the quadruple sculls. In this event she won an Olympic bronze medal in 1976, a world championships silver medal in 1974 and European titles in 1970 and 1971.

References

External links 
 
 
 

1950 births
Living people
Romanian female rowers
Olympic rowers of Romania
Rowers at the 1976 Summer Olympics
Olympic bronze medalists for Romania
Olympic medalists in rowing
World Rowing Championships medalists for Romania
Medalists at the 1976 Summer Olympics
European Rowing Championships medalists
Sportspeople from Arad, Romania